The following is a list of personnel—conductors, singers, soloists and board members—involved with the a capella African-American spiritual–centered Wings Over Jordan Choir from its 1935 founding as the Gethesame Baptist Choir in Cleveland, Ohio, until 1978.

Conductors 
Conductors and directors for the Wings Over Jordan Choir include:
 James E. Tate (1935–38), director of the Gethesame Baptist Choir through their radio debut on WGAR radio and national pickup by CBS
 Worth Kramer (1938–41), program director of WGAR, arranged and published much of the choir's repertoire, directed their 1941 Columbia Masterworks album
 Willette Firmbanks Thompson (1935–41), pianist, assistant director under both Tate and Kramer, believed to be the first female director of a nationally known choir
 Frederick D. Hall (1941–42), interim conductor, professor at Alabama State College
 Gladys Olga Jones (1942), New Orleans native and Dillard University graduate who trained under Fredrick D. Hall
 Joseph S. Powe (1942–43), conductor until leaving to join the United States Navy
 Hattye Easley (1943–46), who also was a soloist; conducted the choir during their 1945–46 USO tour in Europe
 Maurice Goldman (1944–45), shared duties with Hattye Easley and the choir's second white director after Worth Kramer
 James Lewis Elkins (1946–47), led the choir through the initial part of their postwar tour and recognized by the New York Philharmonic as a guest conductor
 Charles E. King (1946–47), later a director of the "Wings Over Hollywood" choir and the Cleveland-based "Kingdom Choir"
 Gilbert F. Allen (1947–49), final conductor for the choir's CBS program, directed their RCA Victor records including "Amen"
 Frank Everett (1949–78), conductor for the choir's "second generation" that continued performing after Rev. Settle's 1995 retirement and 1967 death
 Kenneth Brown Billups (1950–57), conductor for the Legend Singers of St. Louis, which was designated as a satellite unit of Wings by Rev. Settle
 Clarence H. Brooks (1950–64), conductor for the East Coast satellite unit of Wings

Singers and soloists 
The following is a list of verified singers and soloists involved with Wings Over Jordan. Because of the total number of singers that were ultimately associated with the choir, either in their original incarnation or the varied satellite units that bore the "Wings Over Jordan Choir" name after 1950, a definitive list is almost impossible to compile.

Original roster 
Former members have estimated that the choir originally had a roster of between 40 and 50 members in the summer of 1937, consisting of mostly unmarried men and women, with an age range between 17 and 30. Two 1957 Call and Post articles that covered a 20th anniversary reunion for the original members of Wings Over Jordan Choir listed the following singers:

 Mabel Allen
 Bertha Austin
 Louis Lucas Baker
 Rufus Baker
 Paul Breckenridge
 Robert Bullock
 Ruth Wyatt Burke
 Ralph Caldwell
 Mary R. Carpenter
 Alice Carroll
 Elizabeth Settle Carter
 Jesse Chaney
 Ezekiel Samuel Dearon
 Helen Springs Dixon
 Ben Dortch
 Persie Ford
 Gladys Hauser-Bates Goodloe
 Grace Spearman Goodman
 George H. Grant
 Alice Harper
 Norman Harris
 Neil Harrison
 Cynthia Hayes
 Marvin Hayes
 Leroy Johnson
 William Johnson
 Lucille Jones
 Julia Kelly
 William Kelly
 Walter Malloy
 David Martin
 Lois Waterford Parker
 Fred Parks
 Rev. Henry Payden
 Rev. Earl Preston, Jr.
 Gwendolyn Settle Rates
 Rev. Montgomery Rates
 Lewis Richardson
 Evelyn Freeman Roberts
 Thomas Roberts
 Anne Mae W. Ross
 Glenn Thomas "Buddy" Settle
 Imedla Herring Shaw
 Gene Shell
 Mildred Caslin Simmons
 Martha Spearman
 Helen Springs
 Olive Thompson
 Williette Firmbanks Thompson
 Hazel Morris Warner
 Cleva Webster

1942 partial roster 
The following 11 singers were identified in an October 27, 1942, concert review in The Pantagraph out of a roster of 20:

 Emory Barnes
 John Carpenter
 Dorothy Clark
 Cecil Dandy
 Hattie Easley
 Gladys Hauser-Bates Goodloe
 Thomas Hunter
 Esther Overstreet
 Joseph S. Powe
 Clarence Small
 Alice Thompson

1945 USO tour roster 
Along with Rev. Glenn T. Settle, business manager Mildred Ridley and conductor Hattye Easley, the following singers took part in a ten-month tour in Europe to perform for overseas military personnel on behalf of the USO:

 Sylvia Avery
 John Carpenter
 Rheda Chatman
 Dorothy Clarke
 Cecil Dandy
 Ezekiel Dearon
 Cynthia Groverly
 Marvin Hayes
 Mildred Hunter
 Myrtle Jones
 William Peoples
 Rell Pierce
 George Rates
 Kenneth Slaugter
 Sherman Sneed
 Eugene Strider
 Ellison White

1950 roster 
The following singers were listed as members in a 1950 promotional booklet:

 Sylvia Avery
 Charles T. Blackburn
 Ernest C. Bledsoe
 Robert G. Brown
 Joseph M. Cabiness
 Walter T. Clark
 Orlando Donan
 Ruth Fomby
 Eddie Givens, Jr.
 DuWayne Griffin
 Helen Hallums
 Gerald L. Hutton
 Amie Lee Johnson
 Samuel R. Johnson
 Pattie Jean Moore
 Gussie Mae Southall
 Olive Thompson

1951 West Coast roster 
The following singers were listed in a September 27, 1951, concert conducted by Frank Everett, who primarily headed the choir's West Coast "satellite unit":

 Thomas Brown
 Walter T. Clark
 Delores Cordell
 Neil Harrison
 Lorraine Jeffries
 Barbara Mills
 Christine Schooler
 Travestine Underwood
 Leslie Wells

1955 East Coast roster 
These singers were listed in an October 3, 1955, concert conducted by Clarence H. Brooks, who headed the East Coast-based group:

 Clarence H. Brooks
 Edna Mae Brooks
 Adell Emerson
 James Green
 Billye Mathews
 Clementine Patrick
 Alvin Washington
 Bobbie Williams

Additional singers 
The following are additional members of the choir in any incarnation that have been cited and verified elsewhere:

 Sarah Alexander
 Marian Anderson
 Rev. Paschal R. Banks
 Vivian Bradford
 Samuel Brooks, father of actor Avery Brooks
 Dorothy Farmer
 Web Fleming
 Elizabeth James
 Oscar Lindsay
 Steffan Long
 Albert Meadows
 George McCants
 Hazel Morris
 Rev. John H. Ogletree
 Rosemae Ogletree
 William Peebles
 Mildred Pollard
 Herb Reed, later with The Platters
 Leonard Robinson
 Yvonne Ross
 Pinkey Scott
 Mary Carter Settle
 Helen Springs
 Esther Sweet
 Ronald Townson, later with The 5th Dimension
 Edward M. Turner
 Virginia Wright

Board of trustees 
The following people were listed as members of the Wings Over Jordan Choir's board of trustees in December 1943:
 Rev. Glenn T. Settle, Wings Over Jordan Choir founder and director
 Senator Harold H. Burton (R-OH), former mayor of Cleveland
 Rev. Charles H. Crable, president of the Ohio Baptist General Assembly
 Attorney Jules Eshmer, of law firm Davies and Eshner
 Dr. David V. Jemison, president of the National Baptist Convention
 Worth Kramer, general manager of WGKV radio
 Lawrence O. Payne, Cleveland councilman and Call and Post co-publisher

Notes

References

Bibliography

External links
 Wings Over Jordan Choir (WOJC) at Case Western Reserve University's Encyclopedia of Cleveland History
 The Praying Grounds Interviews at Cleveland State University's Cleveland Memory Project
 The Wings Over Jordan Collection at the National Afro-American Museum and Cultural Center

Wings Over Jordan Choir